The Cal 22 is  an American trailerable sailboat that was designed by C. R. Hunt Associates as a cruiser and first built in 1984.

Production
The design was built by Cal Boats in the United States between 1984 and 1997, but it is now out of production. Cal Boats was a brand of Jensen Marine, which was owned by the Bangor Punta Corporation, itself owned by Lear Siegler.

Design
The Cal 22 is a recreational keelboat, built predominantly of fiberglass, with wood trim. It has a fractional sloop or optional masthead sloop rig, a raked stem, a vertical transom, a transom-hung rudder controlled by a tiller and a fixed fin keel or optional shoal draft keel.

The boat is normally fitted with a small  outboard motor for docking and maneuvering.

The design has sleeping accommodation for four people, with a double "V"-berth in the bow cabin and two straight settee quarter berths in the main cabin. The galley is located on the port side just aft of the bow cabin. The galley is equipped with a two-burner stove and a sink. The head is located under the bow cabin berth.

For sailing downwind the design may be equipped with a spinnaker.

Variants
Cal 22 Fin Keel
This model displaces  and carries  of ballast.
Cal 22 Shoal Draft
This model displaces  and carries  of ballast.

Operational history
In a 2010 review Steve Henkel wrote, "best features: The deck layout is admirably simple, with all lines led to cockpit. Worst features: The Cal 22 came with either a deep (3' 5") or shoal (2' 10") fin keel. The deep keel doesn't match the performance of the Capri 22, a comp[etitor], as is evidenced in the PHRF ratings The shoal-draft version is too shallow to sail adequately upwind, and too deep to make launching as easy as, say the swing keel Beneteau First 235. Headroom and space are better in the Beneteau, too. Altogether, judged against her comp[etitor]s, the Cal does not shine."

See also
List of sailing boat types

References

Keelboats
1980s sailboat type designs
Sailing yachts
Trailer sailers
Sailboat type designs by C. Raymond Hunt Associates
Sailboat types built by Cal Yachts